The Sanford Subdivision is a railroad line owned by CSX Transportation in Florida. The line runs along CSX's A Line from St. Johns (near Jacksonville) south through Palatka to DeLand.  At its north end it continues south from the Jacksonville Terminal Subdivision on the A Line and at its south end it continues south as the Central Florida Rail Corridor. 

Prior to 2011, the Sanford Subdivision continued south from DeLand along the A Line to Auburndale.   In 2011, the Florida Department of Transportation bought the line between DeLand and Poinciana and operates the SunRail commuter rail service over that segment.  The remaining line south of Poinciana was annexed to CSX's Carters Subdivision after the sale. 

CSX still runs local freight on the Sanford Subdivision and on the Central Florida Rail Corridor though through freight trains have since been shifted to the S Line.  All three of Amtrak's Florida trains (the Silver Meteor, Silver Star, and the Auto Train) also run the line round-trip daily.

History

The Sanford Subdivision today operates on tracks that were historically part of the Jacksonville, Tampa and Key West Railway.  That railroad became part the Plant System and later the Atlantic Coast Line Railroad.  Through various mergers, it ended up under the ownership of CSX.

See also
 List of CSX Transportation lines

References

CSX Transportation lines
Florida railroads
Rail infrastructure in Florida
Transportation in Volusia County, Florida
Transportation in Putnam County, Florida
Transportation in St. Johns County, Florida